{{Infobox award
| name = PTC Punjabi Film Awards for Best Actor
| image =
|image_size = 
| image_upright = 
| caption       = The 2020 recipient: Gurpreet Ghuggi & Diljit Dosanjh
| awarded_for = Best Performance by an Actor in a Leading Role
| presenter = PTC Punjabi
| country = India
| year = Jimmy Shergill,  Mel Karade Rabba (2011) 
| holder = Gurpreet Ghuggi ,  Ardaas Karaan 
Diljit Dosanjh, Shadaa(2020)
| website = PTC Awards
}}
The PTC Punjabi Film Awards award for Best Actor is an award, begun in 2011, presented annually at the PTC Awards to an actor via a jury. This is given by PTC Punjabi'' as part of its annual PTC Awards for Punjabi (Pollywood) films. As of 2020, Diljit Dosanjh lead the list, with five wins, followed by Amrinder Gill and Gippy Grewal (three wins each).

Winners and nominees

2010s

2020s

References 

Indian film awards
Punjabi cinema
Punjab, India awards
2011 establishments in Punjab, India
Awards established in 2011